Elvira Lindo (born 23 January 1962) is a Spanish journalist and writer.

Lindo was born in Cádiz. At the age of 12 Lindo moved to Madrid, where she studied journalism at Complutense University of Madrid.  She did not get her degree, as she began to work in television and radio as a speaker, actress and scriptwriter.  Her first novel was based on one of her fictional radio characters, the madrileño boy Manolito Gafotas, who has become a classic of Spanish children's literature.  Manolito is the son of a trucker and lives a humble life in the working-class quarter of Carabanchel.  The character was the protagonist of several first-person novels written with a solid style that includes humour, irony and sharp social criticism.

Lindo has also written adult novels and plays; she is the screenwriter of the film La primera noche de mi vida, and collaborated with director Miguel Albaladejo on the screenplays for Manolito Gafotas and Ataque verbal. She also adapted the screenplay Plenilunio from the novel by her husband, Antonio Muñoz Molina.

Ever since her husband Antonio Muñoz Molina was appointed director of the Instituto Cervantes of New York City, Lindo has lived in New York City. She often writes for the Spanish-language newspaper El País, contributing editorials, and writes freelance work for other magazines and newspapers.

In 1998 Lindo was awarded the Premio Nacional de Literatura Infantil y Juvenil (National Award for Children's and Youth Literature) for her book Los trapos sucios de Manolito Gafotas, and she received the Premio Biblioteca Breve for her adult novel Una palabra tuya. Her next book, Lo que me queda por vivir was released on 3 September 2010.

Lindo debuted as a film directed by co-helming Alguien que cuide de mí along with Daniela Fejerman.

References

External links
 
 
 
 

1962 births
Living people
People from Cádiz
Spanish women writers
Spanish women journalists
El País columnists
21st-century Spanish screenwriters